Víctor Muñoz Manrique (born 15 March 1957), known simply as Víctor in his playing days, is a Spanish retired footballer who played as a midfielder, and a manager.

An all-around midfield unit, he was best known for his great physical strength that helped him tire his opponents in the early stages of the match. He spent most of his professional career with Barcelona, winning a total of eight major titles and amassing La Liga totals of 332 games and 25 goals; in the competition, he also represented Zaragoza.

A Spain international during the 1980s, Víctor represented the country in one World Cup and two European Championships. He later became a manager, leading four La Liga teams and winning the Copa del Rey for Zaragoza in 2004.

Playing career

Club
Víctor was born in Zaragoza, Aragon. After starting off with hometown club Real Zaragoza and being relegated in his first professional season, he was purchased by La Liga powerhouse FC Barcelona, being a very important element for the Catalans during his seven-year spell; on 4 June 1983, he scored his team's first in a 2–1 win against Real Madrid in the final of the Copa del Rey.

Víctor was also one of the first Spaniards to ever play in Serie A, with two seasons with U.C. Sampdoria. After a quick return to Zaragoza he (also known by his first name during his playing days) finished his career at 34, teaming up with former Barça teammate Steve Archibald at St Mirren.

International
Muñoz was a regular player for Spain for most of the 1980s, receiving his first opportunity on 25 March 1981 in a 2–1 friendly win with England and going on to earn a further 59 caps, with three goals. He played for the nation at the 1986 FIFA World Cup as well as the UEFA Euro 1984 (in a final runner-up position, to hosts France) and 1988 tournaments, retiring from international duty immediately after that group stage exit.

International goals

Coaching career
Muñoz started working as a manager in the mid-1990s, being successively at the helm of RCD Mallorca, CD Logroñés, UE Lleida, Villarreal CF and Zaragoza. With the last of those teams, he won the 2003–04 domestic cup with a 3–2 extra time victory over Real Madrid's Galácticos.

On 8 October 2006 Muñoz signed a two-year contract with Greece's Panathinaikos FC, becoming the 18th coach in ten years for The Greens. However, he returned to Spain in June 2007 to take over at Recreativo de Huelva, from where he was sacked the following February.

For the 2008–09 campaign, Muñoz was appointed at Getafe CF on 18 June 2008. Following a string of seven losses in nine games that left the team from the outskirts of Madrid at one point above the relegation zone, he was dismissed in April of the following year, making way for former Real Madrid player Míchel.

In late December 2010, after more than one year out of football, Muñoz was named head coach of Russian Premier League side FC Terek Grozny. He left his post in Chechnya after less than one month due to failed contract negotiations, being replaced by Ruud Gullit.

Muñoz returned to active in early September 2011, when he became Neuchâtel Xamax's third manager of the season, replacing compatriot Joaquín Caparrós at the Swiss club. He continued his career in the country, with a brief stint at FC Sion from December 2012 until February of the following year.

On 19 March 2014, Muñoz returned to Zaragoza, succeeding Paco Herrera at a club at risk of relegation to the third tier. He was dismissed on 24 November with the club in 8th, one point off the play-offs.

Managerial statistics

Honours

Player
Barcelona
La Liga: 1984–85
Copa del Rey: 1982–83, 1987–88
Supercopa de España: 1983
Copa de la Liga: 1983, 1986
UEFA Cup Winners' Cup: 1981–82

Sampdoria
Coppa Italia: 1988–89
UEFA Cup Winners' Cup: 1989–90; Runner-up 1988–89

Spain
UEFA European Championship: Runner-up 1984

Manager
Zaragoza
Copa del Rey: 2003–04
Supercopa de España: 2004

References

External links

1957 births
Living people
Footballers from Zaragoza
Spanish footballers
Association football midfielders
La Liga players
Segunda División players
Real Zaragoza players
FC Barcelona players
Serie A players
U.C. Sampdoria players
Scottish Premier League players
St Mirren F.C. players
Spain under-23 international footballers
Spain amateur international footballers
Spain B international footballers
Spain international footballers
UEFA Euro 1984 players
1986 FIFA World Cup players
UEFA Euro 1988 players
Olympic footballers of Spain
Footballers at the 1980 Summer Olympics
Spanish expatriate footballers
Expatriate footballers in Italy
Expatriate footballers in Scotland
Spanish expatriate sportspeople in Italy
Spanish expatriate sportspeople in Scotland
Spanish football managers
La Liga managers
Segunda División managers
RCD Mallorca managers
CD Logroñés managers
UE Lleida managers
Villarreal CF managers
Real Zaragoza managers
Recreativo de Huelva managers
Getafe CF managers
Super League Greece managers
Panathinaikos F.C. managers
Neuchâtel Xamax FCS managers
FC Sion managers
Spanish expatriate football managers
Expatriate football managers in Greece
Expatriate football managers in Russia
Expatriate football managers in Switzerland
Spanish expatriate sportspeople in Switzerland